Jacques Brugnon and Henri Cochet were the defending champions, but lost in the quarterfinals to Wilmer Allison and John Van Ryn.

Allison and Van Ryn defeated Ian Collins and Colin Gregory in the final, 6–4, 5–7, 6–3, 10–12, 6–4 to win the gentlemen's doubles tennis title at the 1929 Wimbledon Championship.

Seeds

  Jacques Brugnon /  Henri Cochet (quarterfinals)
  John Hennessey /  George Lott (semifinals)
  Frank Hunter /  Bill Tilden (semifinals)
  Ian Collins /  Colin Gregory (final)

Draw

Finals

Top half

Section 1

Section 2

Bottom half

Section 3

Section 4

References

External links

Men's Doubles
Wimbledon Championship by year – Men's doubles